Erkki Veikko Savela (28 June 1919 – 16 July 2015) was a Finnish agronomist, farmer and politician. He served as Minister of Transport and Public Works from 13 April 1962 to 18 December 1963. He was a member of the Parliament of Finland from 1958 to 1970, representing the Agrarian League (which changed its name to Centre Party in 1965). He was born in Lappajärvi and died in Seinäjoki.

References

1919 births
2015 deaths
People from Lappajärvi
Finnish Lutherans
Centre Party (Finland) politicians
Ministers of Transport and Public Works of Finland
Members of the Parliament of Finland (1958–62)
Members of the Parliament of Finland (1962–66)
Members of the Parliament of Finland (1966–70)
University of Helsinki alumni
Finnish military personnel of World War II
20th-century Lutherans